Lodge Hunt Kerrigan (born March 23, 1964) is an American motion picture screenwriter and director. His 2010 film Rebecca H. (Return to the Dogs) entered into the Un Certain Regard section of the 2010 Cannes Film Festival.

Along with Amy Seimetz, Kerrigan is the creator/director of Starz' TV adaptation of Steven Soderbergh's The Girlfriend Experience. 

Kerrigan earned his B.A. from Columbia University in 1985.

Filmography

Film
 Clean, Shaven (1994, won Independent Spirit Awards Someone to Watch Award)
 Claire Dolan (1998, nominated for Independent Spirit Award – Best Director)
 Keane (2004)
 Rebecca H. (Return to the Dogs) (2010)

Television
 Homeland (2012, Episode: "State of Independence")
 Longmire (2013, Episode: "Carcasses")
 The Killing (2013-2014; Episodes: "That You Fear the Most", "Try", "Unraveling")
 The Americans (2014; A Little Night Music)
 Bates Motel (2014; Episode: "Caleb")
 The Red Road (2014; Episode: "The Bad Weapons", "The Great Snake Battle")
 The Girlfriend Experience (2016–present)

References

External links

1964 births
American male screenwriters
Living people
Writers from New York City
Film directors from New York City
Screenwriters from New York (state)

Columbia College (New York) alumni